Prospect Park–Southland Park Historic District is a national historic district in West Palm Beach, Florida in Palm Beach County. Including buildings from 1922 to 1945, it is bounded by Lake Worth, S Dixie HWY, Monceaux Rd, and Monroe Dr.

It was added to the National Register of Historic Places in 2011.

References

National Register of Historic Places in Palm Beach County, Florida
Historic districts on the National Register of Historic Places in Florida
Historic districts in Palm Beach County, Florida